Trichromia metaleuca is a moth in the family Erebidae. It was described by Paul Dognin in 1911. It is found in Venezuela.

References

Natural History Museum Lepidoptera generic names catalog

Moths described in 1911
metaleuca